The benzhydryl compounds are a group of organic compounds whose parent structures include diphenylmethane (which is two benzene rings connected by a single methane), with any number of attached substituents, including bridges. This group typically excludes compounds in which either benzene is fused to another ring (bicyclic, tricyclic, polycyclic) or includes a heteroatom, or where the methane connects to three or four benzenes.

The benzhydryl radical can be abbreviated  or Bzh.

Carboaromatic

Alcohols
Acyclic: pridinol
Pyrolidino: diphenylprolinol
2-Piperidine: pipradrol
4-Piperidine: terfenadine, fexofenadine
Benzilic ester: QNB, JB-336, JB-318, benactyzine

Alkenes
Tricycle: amitriptyline, melitracen, cyclobenzaprine, tianeptine, amineptine, clopenthixol, chlorprothixene, flupentixol, thiothixene, zuclopenthixol
Tricyclic and piperidine: pimethixene, cyproheptadine
Acyclic: gilutensin

Alkyl(amine)s
Acyclic: (3-phenylpropylamine), tolpropamine, tolterodine
Piperidine: desoxypipradrol, budipine
N-alkyl-4-piperidinol: penfluridol
N-arylalkyl-piperidine: pimozide
Tetrahydronaphthalene: tametraline (4-phenylaminotetralin), sertraline
Tetrahydroisoquinoline: nomifensine, diclofensine "tetrahydronaphisoquinoline", dinapsoline (see doxanthrine and dinoxyline)
Pyrroloisoquinoline: JNJ-7925476
Indanamine: Lu 19-005
Tricyclic: 9-Aminomethyl-9,10-dihydroanthracene, phenindamine (see MPTP)
Tetracyclic: maprotiline, dihydrexidine, butaclamol, ecopipam
Tetrahydrobenzazepine: SKF-83959, SKF-82958, SKF-81297, SKF 38393, fenoldopam, 6-Br-APB, SCH 23390
Piperazine: amperozide
Triazaspiro: fluspirilene

Alkoxy compounds
Acyclic (3 °C): diphenhydramine (c.f deramciclane), orphenadrine, p-methyldiphenhydramine
Acyclic (4 °C): moxastine, Clemastine, embramine,
Piperazine: GBR-12935, GBR 12909, DBL-583
Tropine: benztropine, deptropine, etybenzatropine, difluoropine
Piperidine: diphenylpyraline
Phthalane: talopram, citalopram
Octahedral: nefopam
Benzdihydropyran: A-68930 (isochromene)

Amines
Piperazine: cyclizine, clocinizine, hydroxyzine, meclozine, cetirizine, dotarizine, cinnarizine
Benzazepine: mianserin
Tetracyclic: dizocilpine

Other
Aromatic alkoxy: bifemelane, phenyltoloxamine
Keto: phenadoxone, methadone, dipipanone, etc.
Amido: dextromoramide
Imino: benzodiazepine, GYKI-52895
Sulfinyl: modafinil, adrafinil
Pituxate gem-diphenylcyclopropane

Heteroaromatic
These species are not strictly benzhydryl-containing but are analogous.

Heteroaromatic rings
Alkene: thiambutene, loratadine
Alkylamine: A-86929, amfonelic acid

Benzenes linked by a non-carbon atom
Nitrogen: promethazine, imipramine, acepromazine, chlorpromazine, fluphenazine, mesoridazine, levomepromazine, perazine, periciazine, perphenazine, prochlorperazine, sulforidazine, thioridazine, trifluoperazine, triflupromazine, clozapine, thiethylperazine
Indolic nitrogen: sertindole
Oxygen: loxapine, asenapine, tyrima

Benzene and heterocycle linked through a non-carbon
Olanzapine

References

External links

, a.k.a. called benzhydryl bromide
, not called benzhydryl bromide

 
Aromatic compounds